Big Island Air is a small American air tour operator serving Hawaii.  It is based at Kona International Airport and visitors can fly over the active Kilauea Volcano, and the landscape and coastline of the Island of Hawaii.

Fleet
Cessna 208 Caravan
Cessna Skymaster
C421 (Golden Eagle)

Incidents and accidents
The most notable accident involving a Big Island Air aircraft was the 1999 crash on the slopes of Mauna Loa, which led to 10 fatalities. The cause of the crash was due to pilot error.

References

External links
Big Island Air

Airlines based in Hawaii
Companies based in Hawaii
Airlines established in 1985